Lucien Sainte-Rose (born 29 May 1953) is a French athlete who specialises in the 100 and 200 meters. Sainte-Rose was born in Fort-de-France, Martinique, and competed at the 1972 Summer Olympics and 1976 Summer Olympics.

References 
 sports reference

1953 births
Living people
People from Fort-de-France
Martiniquais athletes
French male sprinters
Olympic athletes of France
French people of Martiniquais descent
Athletes (track and field) at the 1972 Summer Olympics
Athletes (track and field) at the 1976 Summer Olympics
European Athletics Championships medalists
Mediterranean Games gold medalists for France
Athletes (track and field) at the 1975 Mediterranean Games
Mediterranean Games medalists in athletics